All Rise: A Joyful Elegy for Fats Waller is an album by Jason Moran paying tribute to pianist/composer Fats Waller which was released on the Blue Note label.

Reception 

Response was positive, with Metacritic assigning the album an aggregate score of 86 out of 100 based on 6 critical reviews indicating "Universal acclaim".

The AllMusic review by Steve Leggett called it "a marvelous tribute that still retains its own shape and coherency" and stated "it's not what one would expect. This album isn't full of stride piano, but it is full of Fats Waller's larger persona as a performer ... It's a stunning mix of piano jazz with moody, winsome late-night vocals, and it has plenty of get-up-and-go when it's time for it. If it doesn't sound much like Waller, one could imagine Waller would love it, and his signature songs are well represented".

All About Jazz reviewer Mark F. Turner said, "All Rise: A Joyful Elegy for Fats Waller re-envisions the music of the colorful pianist, singer, and entertainer who shook things up during the Harlem Renaissance in the 1920s and 1930s. Fats Waller's bright musical canvas is the perfect outlet for Moran's multicolored ideas; a boisterous amalgam of blues, jazz, and house music ... Regardless of the era in which created, music still has the ability to move listeners in varied ways whether to sing, dance, or simply listen in a new way".

The jazz critic John Fordham, writing for The Guardian, commented: "Some Waller devotees will recoil, but this is a respectful tribute from a remarkable modern-music mind".

The PopMatters review by Will Layman observed "All Rise, then, seeks to provide a contemporary vision of Waller's music. And the challenge in doing so is not one born of the music seeming so old. Waller's music has been so resilient and popular for so long ... The challenge for Moran and Ndegeocello is to refract the music in ways that make it sound more vibrant and alive than its modern jazz variants could ... All Rise proves yet again that the cultural divide, at least in “jazz”, has crumbled and means little now—and that’s something to get on your feet and cheer (or dance) about".

In JazzTimes, Brad Farberman noted "All Rise is a mischievous record, rearranging Waller’s tunes and then daring the listener to recognize them. Or not dance to them. All Rise benefits from a healthy dose of misbehavior".

Track listing 
All compositions by Jason Moran except where noted
 "Put Your Hands on It" – 0:20
 "Ain't Misbehavin'" (Fats Waller, Harry Brooks, Andy Razaf) – 3:42
 "Yacht Club Swing" (Waller, Herman Autrey, J. C. Johnson) – 4:02
 "Lulu's Back In Town" (Harry Warren, Al Dubin) – 2:38
 "Two Sleepy People" (Hoagy Carmichael, Frank Loesser) – 4:07
 "The Joint Is Jumpin'" (Waller, Johnson, Razaf) – 5:10
 "Honeysuckle Rose" (Waller, Razaf) – 3:48
 "Ain't Nobody's Business" (Porter Grainger, Everett Robbins) – 4:20
 "Fats Elegy" – 1:46
 "Handful of Keys" (Waller) – 2:55
 "Jitterbug Waltz'" (Waller) – 6:13
 "Sheik of Araby/I Found a New Baby" (Ted Snyder, Harry B. Smith, Francis Wheeler/Jack Palmer, Spencer Williams) – 5:00

Personnel 
Musicians
 Jason Moran – piano, Wurlitzer electric piano, Rhodes piano
 Leron Thomas – trumpet, vocals
 Josh Roseman – trombone
 Steve Lehman – saxophone
 Tarus Mateen – bass, double bass
 Nasheet Waits – drums
 Charles Haynes – drums, vocals
 Meshell Ndegeocello – vocals
 Lisa E. Harris – vocals

Production
 Don Was – producer, A&R
 Meshell Ndegeocello –  producer
 Bob Power – engineer (recording tracks 1–3, 5–11 & mixing)
 Rick Kawn – engineer (2nd)
 Andy Taub – engineer (recording tracks 4 & 12)
 Pete Min – engineer (mastering)
 Ivy Skoff – production coordinator
 Steve Cook – A&R administrator
 Hayden Miller – art direction, design

References 

2014 albums
Albums produced by Don Was
Blue Note Records albums
Fats Waller tribute albums
Jason Moran (musician) albums